Nupsskåka Valley is an ice-filled valley at the southwest side of Nupsskarvet Mountain in the Kurze Mountains of Queen Maud Land. Mapped from surveys and air photos by Norwegian Antarctic Expedition (1956–60) and named Nupsskåka (the peak shaft).

Valleys of Queen Maud Land
Princess Astrid Coast